In finance, curb trading is the trading of securities outside the mainstream stock exchange, either because the company operating the exchange has very strict listing requirements (cf: alternative stock exchange) or because investors are so interested to continue trading even after the official business hours that they set up alternative avenues for their trading, sometimes even the curbs outside the main stock exchange, which is the origin of the phrase.

See also
Curbstone broker
New York Curb Exchange
American Stock Exchange (Amex or AMEX)
Chicago Curb Exchange
Pink Sheets
Over-the-counter (finance)
American depository receipt
Dark pool

Financial markets